In computer vision, the Kanade–Lucas–Tomasi (KLT) feature tracker is an approach to feature extraction. It is proposed mainly for the purpose of dealing with the problem that traditional image registration techniques are generally costly. KLT makes use of spatial intensity information to direct the search for the position that yields the best match. It is faster than traditional techniques for examining far fewer potential matches between the images.

The registration problem

 L1 norm: 
 L2 norm: 
 Negative of normalized correlation:

Basic description of the registration algorithm

The KLT feature tracker is based on two papers:

In the first paper, Lucas and Kanade developed the idea of a local search using gradients weighted by an approximation to the second derivative of the image.

One-dimensional case

If  is the displacement between two images  and  then the approximation is made that

so that

This approximation to the gradient of the image is only accurate if the displacement of the local area between the two images to be registered is not too large.

For the purpose of facilitating the expression, a weighting function is defined:

The average with weighting is thereby:

The procedure is applied repeatedly, yielding a type of Newton–Raphson iteration. The sequence of estimates will ideally converge to the best . The iteration can be expressed by

An alternative derivation

The derivation above cannot be generalized well to two dimensions for the 2-D linear approximation occurs differently. This can be corrected by applying the linear approximation in the form:

This is basically the same as the 1-D case, except for the fact that the weighting function  And the iteration form with weighting can be expressed as:

Performance

To evaluate the performance of the algorithm, we are naturally curious about under what conditions and how fast the sequence of 's converges to the real .

Consider the case:

The range of convergence can be improved by suppressing high spatial frequencies in the image, which could be achieved by smoothing the image, that will also undesirably suppress small details of it. If the window of smoothing is much larger than the size of the object being matched, the object may be suppressed entirely, so that a match would be no longer possible.

Since lowpass-filtered images can be sampled at lower resolution with no loss of information, a coarse-to-fine strategy is adopted. A low-resolution smoothed version of the image can be used to obtain an approximate match. Applying the algorithm to higher resolution images will refine the match obtained at lower resolution.

As smoothing extends the range of convergence, the weighting function improves the accuracy of approximation, speeding up the convergence. Without weighting, the calculated displacement  of the first iteration with  falls off to zero as the displacement approaches one-half wavelength.

Implementation

where  is chosen appropriately small.

Some sophisticated technique can be used for estimating the first derivatives, but in general such techniques are equivalent to first smoothing the function, and then taking the difference.

Generalization to multiple dimensions

The registration algorithm for 1-D and 2-D can be generalized to more dimensions. To do so, we try to minimize the L2 norm measure of error:

A linear approximation analogous:

And partially differentiate  with respect to :

which has much the same form as the 1-D version.

Further generalizations

The method can also be extended to take into account registration based on more complex transformations, such as rotation, scaling, and shearing, by considering

where  is a linear spatial transform. The error to be minimized is then

The approximation can be used similarly to find the error expression, which becomes quadratic in the quantities to be minimized with respect to. After figuring out the error expression, differentiate it with respect to the quantities to be minimized and set the results zero, yielding a set of linear equations, then solve them.

A further generalization is designed for accounting for the fact that the brightness may be different in the two views, due to the difference of the viewpoints of the cameras or to differences in the processing of the two images. Assume the difference as linear transformation:

where  represents a contrast adjustment and  represents a brightness adjustment.

Combining this expression with the general linear transformation registration problem:

Detection and tracking of point features

In the second paper Tomasi and Kanade used the same basic method for finding the registration due to the translation but improved the technique by tracking features that are suitable for the tracking algorithm. The proposed features would be selected if both the eigenvalues of the gradient matrix were larger than some threshold.

By a very similar derivation, the problem is formulated as

where  is the gradient. This is the same as the last formula of Lucas–Kanade above.

A tracking method based on these two papers is generally considered a KLT tracker.

Improvements and variations

In a third paper, Shi and Tomasi proposed an additional stage of verifying that features were tracked correctly.

An affine transformation is fit between the image of the currently tracked feature and its image from a non-consecutive previous frame. If the affine compensated image is too dissimilar the feature is dropped.

The reasoning is that between consecutive frames a translation is a sufficient model for tracking but due to more complex motion, perspective effects, etc. a more complex model is required when frames are further apart.

Using a similar derivation as for the KLT, Shi and Tomasi showed that the search can be performed using the formula

References

See also

 Kanade–Tomasi features in the context of feature detection
 Lucas–Kanade method, an optical flow algorithm derived from reference 1.

Motion in computer vision